Jack Catterall (born 1 July 1993) is an English professional boxer who held the British light-welterweight title in 2017 and challenged for the undisputed light-welterweight title in February 2022.

Early life 

Jack Catterall was born on 1 July 1993 in Chorley, Lancashire. One of nine children in the household, Catterall took part in judo and wrestling before finding his way into boxing at the age of 10. Before getting into boxing full time, he took a college course in public services and worked a job laying tarmac to fund his gym sessions.

Amateur career 
Catterall boxed out of Chorley ABC from the age of 10 and compiled an amateur record of 48–18, during a career in which he won a CYP (Clubs for Young People) National title and placed second in the ABAE Junior Championships.

Professional career

Early career 
Catterall made his professional debut against Carl Allen on 22 September 2012 at the Bowlers Exhibition Centre in Manchester, winning by points decision (PTS) over four rounds. He fought once more in 2012, defeating Johnny Greaves via first-round technical knockout (TKO).

He started 2013 with a fourth-round TKO win over Carl Allen in March, and secured another three wins that year; Mark McKray via PTS in April; a second-round knockout (KO) over Tom Price in June; and Renald Garrido via PTS in November.

Following his first fight of 2014 – a fifth-round TKO victory over Aleksas Vaseris in March – it was announced that Catterall had signed a two-year contract with Frank Warren's Queensberry Promotions. His first fight with the company was an eight-round points decision victory over Krzysztof Szot in May. Up next was a fight with undefeated prospect Nathan Brough (11–0) on 26 July at the Phones 4u Arena in Manchester. Both fighters had success in round one – Brough with the jab and Catterall with a few clean shots to the head. The second-round saw much of the same, until Catterall landed a vicious counter left hook to the chin of Brough which left the Liverpudlian needing medical attention in the ring, scoring a TKO win with 58 seconds left in the round to capture the Central Area light-welterweight title. His final fight of 2014 came on 25 October at the Echo Arena, Liverpool, against Tom Stalker, friend of Catterall's previous opponent, Nathan Brough. Stalker, a 2012 Olympian and also unbeaten with a record of 9–0, had pulled out of a British light-welterweight title eliminator against Chris Jenkins in favour of facing Catterall. Catterall dropped Stalker in the first and second rounds. With 12 seconds remaining in the eighth-round, referee Mark Lyons waved off the fight after a left hook from Catterall sent Stalker stumbling on unsteady legs, giving Catterall the TKO win and the WBO European light-welterweight title.

On 6 March 2015, Catterall fought Cesar David Inalef (18–5–1) for the vacant WBO Inter-Continental light-welterweight title at the Echo Arena in Liverpool. After a controlled performance, in which Catterall had Inalef down in the second-round from a body shot and knocked the Argentines mouthpiece out on three occasions, Catterall scored a fifth-round TKO with 1 minute and 3 seconds remaining. He successfully defended his WBO regional title three times in 2015; a sixth-round TKO over Gabriel Calfin in September; a ten-round UD over Jarkko Putkonen in October; and a third-round TKO over Noe Nunez in December to finish the year.

British champion 
He had three decision wins in 2016; a defence against Joe Hughes in a British light-welterweight final eliminator in May; Lukasz Janik in an eight-round non-title bout in August; and another defence against Diego Gonzalo Luque in December.

He began 2017 with a third-round TKO win over Martin Gethin in April, in what would be Gethin's final professional bout, before going on to challenge British light-welterweight champion Tyrone Nurse (35–2–2) on 21 October, at the First Direct Arena in Leeds. Catterall won by UD with the scorecards reading 118–111, 116–113 and 115–114, to capture the British light-welterweight title. Shortly after winning the title, Catterall vacated in favour of continuing down the WBO title route.

World title contention 
Starting out 2018 with a first-round KO over Kevin McCauley in a non-title bout in March 2018, Catterall went on to successfully defend his WBO Inter-Continental title a further three times that year; scoring a first-round TKO over Christopher Sebire in May; a ten-round unanimous decision over undefeated Tyrone McKenna in June; and ending with a twelve-round UD over Ohara Davies in October.

In January 2019, it was announced that Catterall had been installed as the mandatory challenger to WBO light-welterweight champion Maurice Hooker. While waiting for a fight with Hooker, Catterall took a stay-busy fight in April, defeating Oscar Amador via third-round KO. In August, the WBO announced they had sanctioned a unification fight between Hooker and WBC champion José Ramírez, with the winner set to face Catterall as the mandatory challenger within 120 days of the bout. In the meantime, Catterall took another stay-busy fight, defeating Timo Schwarzkopf via UD in November.

After Ramírez defeated Hooker in July 2020 to become a unified champion, the WBO ordered Ramírez to face Catterall. Around the same time, the WBC also ordered Ramírez to face their mandatory challenger, Viktor Postol. Ramírez faced Postol in August 2020, with the agreement that Catterall face the winner. Less than 48 hours after Ramírez emerged victorious, the WBO once again ordered Ramírez to face Catterall. Catterall opted to take a step-aside deal in order to allow Ramírez to face WBA (Super), IBF, and The Ring champion, Josh Taylor, again with the agreement that the winner face Catterall next. Taylor defeated Ramírez in May 2021, unifying all four major world titles to set up an undisputed championship fight with Catterall.

Undisputed championship challenge 

In August, ESPN reported that Catterall and Taylor had agreed terms to meet on 18 December at the SSE Hydro in Glasgow. It was announced by Taylor on 21 October that he had suffered an injury, and thus the fight would be postponed to 26 February 2022. Taylor won the bout by split decision with the judges’ scorecards reading 114-111, 113-112 for Taylor and 113-112 for Catterall. The bout is widely regarded by fans and pundits to have been a robbery as many saw Jack Catterall winning the fight.

Judge Ian John-Lewis who scored the bout 114-111 faced punishment from the British Boxing Board of Control for how widely he scored the fight for Josh Taylor. The BBBofC said in a statement, “The Stewards of the board decided to downgrade [Lewis] from an A Star Class to an A Star Official.”

Professional boxing record

References

External links

Living people
1993 births
Sportspeople from Chorley
Light-welterweight boxers
English male boxers
British Boxing Board of Control champions